Freestyle is an art collection by Japanese artist Satoshi Ohno. Freestyle was released in 2008 and exhibits Ohno's works, created before he had entered Johnny & Associates, Inc. Freestyle includes paintings, clay models, photographs, big objects d'art, and more. It was bought for about 200,000.
Also, Freestyle is an art exhibition that took place in Tokyo in February 2008. It was synthetically produced by Satoshi Ohno. There were about 100 small figures and 20 paintings that were inserted in the photograph collection, a big, golden objet d'art which was modeled after the artist's face, a robot, and a chair made of rubbish. In May, it changed its name to "Freestyle All Around Japan". The exhibition traveled to Osaka, Nagoya, Tokyo, Sapporo and Fukuoka, all in Japan.

References 

Photography exhibitions